Bioverativ Inc. is an American multinational biotechnology company that specializes in the discovery, development, and delivery of therapies for the treatment of haemophilia. Bioverativ competes with Baxalta (acquired by Shire Plc in 2016), Pfizer and Novo Nordisk. The company traded on the NASDAQ exchange under the ticker symbol BIVV until Sanofi completed its acquisition on March 8, 2018.

History
In May 2016 Biogen announced that it would spin off its hemophilia drug business (Eloctate and Alprolix) into a separate public company. In August, Biogen announced they would call the spun off company Bioverativ to show heritage with Biogen, and would be spun off in early 2017. On December 22, the Securities and Exchange Commission approved Bioverativ's registration statement, with the official separation date of the two companies being pegged at February 2017. In February, Biogen investors received a special dividend of one share of Bioverativ stock for every two shares of Biogen stock held as of January 17. Bioverativ began trading on January 12, 2017.

In May 2017, the company announced it would acquire True North Therapeutics for $825 million, strengthening Bioverativ's pipeline with the acquisition of TNT009 – a treatment for cold agglutinin disease.

In January 2018, Sanofi announced that it would acquire the business, for $11.6 billion.

Acquisition history
The following is an illustration of the company's major mergers and acquisitions and historical predecessors:

Products
The company has two current products; Alprolix and Eloctate, both products provided combined revenues of $604 million in 2015, and $640 million in the first nine months of 2016 (contributing to ~6% of Biogens' total revenue.  These products are marketed in the United States, European Union, Japan, Canada and Australia.

References

American companies established in 2016
Companies formerly listed on the Nasdaq
Multinational companies headquartered in the United States
Biotechnology companies established in 2016
Biotechnology companies of the United States
Corporate spin-offs
Sanofi
2018 mergers and acquisitions
Pharmaceutical companies disestablished in 2018
American subsidiaries of foreign companies